The Federal University Lokoja, popularly known as Fulokoja or by its acronym, FUL, is a federal university in the confluence city of Lokoja, the capital of Kogi State,  North-Central Nigeria. Lokoja lies at the confluence of the Niger and Benue rivers.

The Federal University Lokoja was established in February 2011 by the Federal Government of Nigeria as a result of indispensable need to create more universities in the country.

Faculties and College
Faculty of Sciences
Faculty of Arts 
Faculty of Social Science
Faculty of Management Science
Faculty of Education
College of Health Sciences

See also
List of universities in Nigeria

External links 

 Federal University Lokoja

References

 
Kogi State
Educational institutions established in 2011
2011 establishments in Nigeria
Federal universities of Nigeria
Educational institutions in Nigeria
Academic libraries in Nigeria